Nub Peak is a  mountain summit located in Mount Assiniboine Provincial Park, in the Canadian Rockies of British Columbia, Canada. Its nearest higher peak is Nestor Peak,  to the west. The mountain is situated north of Sunburst Peaks, with Elizabeth Lake and Cerulean Lake in between. Nub Peak is famous for its panoramic view of Mount Assiniboine with its surrounding lakes and peaks. The mountain's descriptive name was officially adopted in 1924. An arm extending southwest from Nub is officially known as Chucks Ridge, and an arm extending southeast is officially called Nublet. Nub Peak is composed of sedimentary rock laid down during the Cambrian period and pushed east over the top of younger rock during the Laramide orogeny.

Climate

Based on the Köppen climate classification, Nub Peak is located in a subarctic climate zone with cold, snowy winters, and mild summers. Temperatures can drop below −20 °C with wind chill factors below −30 °C.

See also
 Geography of British Columbia
 Geology of British Columbia

References

External links
 Nub Peak weather forecast
Mount Assiniboine Provincial Park

Two-thousanders of British Columbia
Canadian Rockies
Kootenay Land District